The following is a list of actors who have appeared in multiple Palme d'Or winners. The Palme d'Or is awarded every year since 1955 to the best film at the Cannes Film Festival and is widely regarded as one of the film industry's most prestigious prizes.

References

Lists of film actors
Palme d'Or